Barbour's tropical racer (Mastigodryas bruesi)  is a species of snake in the family Colubridae. The species is endemic to the Caribbean.

Etymology
The specific name, bruesi, is in honor American entomologist Charles Thomas Brues, who was one of the collectors of the holotype.

Geographic range
M. bruesi is native to Saint Vincent and the Grenadines, and Grenada.

Description
Dorsally, it is blue-gray to brown, with lighter lateral stripes. Ventrally, it is whitish.

Behavior and diet
M. bruesi is diurnal, hunting frogs and lizards.

Habitat
The preferred natural habitat of M. bruesi is forest, both mesic and xeric. It can be found on the ground, and in bushes, where it sleeps at night.

Reproduction
M. bruesi is oviparous.

Locality records
M. bruesi has been recorded in the southwest corner of Saint Vincent and is widespread all over the Grenadines islands.  It is also found on the southern half of Grenada, which is the farthest south it is distributed.  It has been introduced to Barbados, probably around thirty years ago, where it has been incorrectly identified as Liophis perfuscus.

References

Sources

.
.

Further reading
Barbour T (1914). "A Contribution to the Zoögeography of the West Indies, with Especial Reference to Amphibians and Reptiles". Memoirs of the Museum of Comparative Zoölogy, Harvard College 44 (2): 205-359 + one plate. (Alsophis bruesi, new species, pp. 337–338).
Schwartz A, Henderson RW (1991). Amphibians and Reptiles of the West Indies: Descriptions, Distributions, and Natural History. Gainesville: University of Florida Press. 720 pp. . (Mastigodryas bruesi, p. 626).
Schwartz A, Thomas R (1975). A Check-list of West Indian Amphibians and Reptiles. Carnegie Museum of Natural History Special Publication No. 1. Pittsburgh, Pennsylvania: Carnegie Museum of Natural History. 216 pp. (Mastigodras bruesi, p. 189).

External links

Mastigodryas bruesi at the Encyclopedia of Life

Colubrids
Snakes of the Caribbean
Reptiles of Barbados
Fauna of Saint Vincent and the Grenadines
Fauna of Grenada
Reptiles described in 1914